J26 may refer to:

Roads 
 County Route J26 (California)
 Malaysia Federal Route J26

Vehicles 
 GSR Class J26, an Irish steam locomotive
 LNER Class J26, a British steam locomotive class
 North American J 26 Mustang, an American fighter aircraft in service with the Swedish Air Force

Other uses 
 Gyrobifastigium, a Johnson solid (J26)
 J26 G8 Protests, held in Calgary, Alberta in June 2002
 Small nucleolar RNA J26